The Cocoa Astros were a short-lived professional minor league baseball team based Cocoa, Florida in . Managed by Leo Posada, the club was a member of the rookie-level Florida East Coast League. During their only season in existence, the team posted a 26–30 record, which gave them third place in the league.

Notable alumni
Al Javier
Leo Posada
Luis Sánchez
Rick Williams

References
BR 1972 Cocoa Astros

Defunct minor league baseball teams
Defunct baseball teams in Florida
Baseball teams established in 1972
1972 establishments in Florida
1972 disestablishments in Florida
Cocoa, Florida
Baseball teams disestablished in 1972